Céline sur les Plaines is the ninth home video by Canadian singer Celine Dion, released on DVD in Canada by Productions J on 11 November 2008. Entitled Live à Quebec, it was also issued in France, Belgium and Switzerland by TF1 Video on 20 May 2009. The DVD includes Dion's historic concert in Quebec City in front of 250,000 spectators, which took place on the Plains of Abraham on 22 August 2008 in celebration of the city's 400th anniversary. The release was commercially successful reaching number one on the charts in Canada, France and Belgium, and number two in Switzerland. In 2009, Céline sur les Plaines received a Félix Award for the DVD of the Year.

Background and release
In June 2008, it was announced that Dion will celebrate Quebec City's 400th birthday with special concert on the historic Plains of Abraham on 22 August 2008. Dion personally chose all of the special guest performers for her show. The list of Quebec artists scheduled to perform included: Garou, Marc Dupré, Nanette Workman, Dan Bigras, Mes Aïeux, the Dion family, Zachary Richard, Éric Lapointe, Claude Dubois, Jean-Pierre Ferland and Ginette Reno. Dion and invited artists performed over thirty songs in front of 250,000 spectators. The concert was also broadcast live on giant screens in Lévis, Quebec for an additional 100,000 people. The show was available the next day and until early September, through video-on-demand Vidéotron, Shaw and Cogeco. The distribution of this show was very successful with viewers across Canada. Nearly 130,000 subscribers took advantage of the special offer of the largest cable companies and broadcasters in the country. On 21 September 2008, the show was broadcast on the TVA network, attracting nearly 1.8 million viewers and becoming the evening's most-watched broadcast in Quebec.

In October 2008, celinedion.com announced that Dion's historic concert will soon be available on DVD in its entirety. Céline sur les Plaines was released in Canada on 11 November 2008. The DVD features over three hours of concert footage, never seen before bonus material and exclusive behind the scenes clips (footage filmed the day of the show, backstage and during rehearsal). On 20 May 2009, the DVD entitled Live à Quebec was released in France, Belgium and Switzerland. A collector's edition featuring ten exclusive photographs autographed by Dion was also issued in a digipak.

Commercial performance
Céline on the Plains debuted at number one on the Canadian Music DVD Chart, selling 32,800 copies. It became the DVD with the biggest weekly sales in Canada in 2008, all genres, all languages and all artists alike. After just three weeks, 49,059 units of Céline sur les Plaines were sold. As of June 2014, it has sold over 100,000 copies and is eligible for Diamond certification in Canada.
 
Live à Quebec also entered the French chart at number one and spent three weeks at the top. It has sold 34,350 copies in 2009, becoming the best selling music DVD by a female artist in France that year and tenth best selling music DVD overall. In 2010, Live à Quebec has sold additional 5,500 units, bringing total sales to 39,850 copies. As of June 2014, it has sold over 45,000 copies and is eligible for triple Platinum certification in France.

In Belgium Wallonia, Live à Quebec entered the chart at number one and spent four weeks at the top. In Switzerland, it peaked at number two and in Belgium Flanders, it reached number ten.

Accolades

In October 2009, Céline sur les Plaines received a Félix Award for the DVD of the Year.

Track listing

Charts

Weekly charts

Year-end charts

Release history

See also
Félix Award

References

 

2008 video albums
Celine Dion video albums
Live video albums
Music festivals in Quebec City